Thierry Pecqueux (born 12 January 1965) is a French gymnast. He competed in eight events at the 1988 Summer Olympics.

References

1965 births
Living people
French male artistic gymnasts
Olympic gymnasts of France
Gymnasts at the 1988 Summer Olympics
People from Nevers
Sportspeople from Nièvre